The Smilkovci Lake killings also called the Smilkovci Lake massacre (Macedonian: Масакрот кај Смилковско езеро) took place on 12 April 2012. Five ethnic Macedonian civilians were shot and killed at a man-made lake near the village of Smilkovci, outside the Macedonian capital Skopje.

According to the Macedonian Ministry of Internal Affairs, the attack was carried out with the intent to "incite fear and insecurity" and the ministry called it a "deliberate terrorist act aimed at destabilizing the country". The Helsinki Committee for Human Rights criticized the ministry for prematurely judging the suspects as guilty.

On 30 June 2014, after an 18-month trial, Alil Demiri, Afrim Ismailoviq (also known as Afrim Ismaili), Agim Ismailoviq (also known as Agim Ismaili), Fejzi Aziri, Haki Aziri and Sami Luta were sentenced to life imprisonment. Demiri and Ismailoviq were tried in absentia, since they were imprisoned in Kosovo for unlawful possession of weapons, and extradition procedures were underway. One defendant, Rami Sejdi, was released for lack of evidence.

On 1 December 2017, Macedonia's Supreme Court overturned the convictions and ordered a retrial over procedural errors. In February 2021, the five men were once again found guilty and handed sentences ranging from nine years to life imprisonment.

Killings

Four of the five men killed were between 18 and 20 years of age, and the fifth was 45 years old.

Aftermath

Early police work 
After the residents of the villages where the victims lived heard about the killings, angry crowds blocked the highway near the Smilkovci lake. An OSCE vehicle was attacked after an OSCE employee drove the vehicle towards an angry crowd of ethnic Macedonians. Interior Minister Gordana Jankuloska said in a press conference that "more than one perpetrator" killed five fishermen and that "by this point we [the police] are still unable to say that the killings were ethnic-related because the police have no suspects".

On 15 April, the Macedonian police contacted police in neighboring countries and found a car thought to have been used by the killers near the border with Kosovo. The Interior Minister said that the police had the killers' "profile" but had not identified them.

Operation Monster 
In the early hours of 1 May 2012 about 800 police officers raided 26 properties, arresting 20 people on a variety of charges. They were confirmed by Macedonian Interior Minister Gordana Jankuloska as Islamic fundamentalists, some of whom had fought in Pakistan and Afghanistan. The arrests took place in the villages of Šuto Orizari, Jaja Paša and Aračinovo, and weapons were found in the residences of the suspects. Also, among the seized items, National Liberation Army propraganda was present. The police used surveillance and phone tapping during the operation.

In addition to primary assailants Afrim Ismailoviq (alias Afrim Ismaili), Agim Ismailoviq (alias Agim Ismaili), Alil Demiri, Fejzi Aziri and Rami Sejdi, police also charged a number of co-conspirators and associates. At the home of Nazif Memeti, police found a handgun and ammunition. Ibrahim Zajdini possessed an automatic firearm, several magazines of ammunition and a hand grenade. Sixty-year-old grandmother Feride Bilalli possessed substantial ammunition for automatic firearms, ammunition belts for machine guns, military camouflage clothing with National Liberation Army insignia and symbols, and NLA identity cards and photo albums. Father and son Isni and Ramadan Asani had weapons in their home. A special report to the public prosecutor was filed against Qezmedin Demiri, Haki Aziri, Muamer Qailovski (alias Muamer Qaili), Besim Hajdari, Mervan Memeti, Abdula Rashitov (alias Abdula Rashiti), Suraj Asipi, Mirvet Ismailoviq (alias Mirvet Ismaili), Kimet Demiri, Qani Aziri and Rami Xhaviti. On 3 May 2012, 13 of the 20 arrested suspects were released and charges were brought against four others for weapons possession.

Protests 
Protests were organised in cities and towns throughout Macedonia, two of which turned violent: in the village of Smiljkovci (the victims' home) and the city of Skopje. The Skopje protest was organized by young people, who wanted to march in the Saraj Municipality where there is an Albanian-speaking majority. The protesters were stopped by police, which sparked a 10-minute conflict between police and protesters. The protesters were recorded as chanting, "A good Albanian is a dead Albanian" and "Gas chambers for the Albanians".
A large, peaceful protest was reportedly organised by Čkembari in Bitola, where Macedonian demonstrators marched through the main street of Širok Sokak and lit candles for the victims under the city's clock tower.

Operation Monster reaction
On 4 May 2012 fifteen to twenty thousand ethnic Albanians protested in Skopje in support of the accused, demanding the release of the arrested Albanians and chanting "To be an Albanian is not a crime", UÇK", and "See you in the mountains". Protesters threw rocks at police and smashed the windows of a bus stop. Shukri Alia, blacklisted by the EU and wanted by Macedonian police for murder and armed attacks on two Skopje police stations, led efforts to organise protests; according to police, Alia was hiding in Kosovo. Kosovo Internal Affairs Minister Bajram Rexhepi said that any murder suspects hiding in Kosovo would be arrested.

The following day, US Republican politician Joseph J. DioGuardi, ethnic Albanian by origin, said:
"The Macedonian and Serbian governments have designed a well-orchestrated top secret plan, aiming to compromise and stain the freedom-loving Albanian people in front of the world public opinion. Albanians are facing brutal tortures which have taken ultra-nationalist connotations. The Albanian people are not terrorists".

Former NLA commander Xhezair Shaqiri said that he would begin a guerrilla war to protect Albanians in Macedonia and the Morava River valley. Shaqiri met with former National Liberation Army and Kosovo Liberation Army (UÇK) members, discussing the need to protect the Albanian populations of Macedonia and southern Serbia against "ethnic cleansing".

On 11 May, five  to ten thousand Albanians protested in front of the government building in Skopje demanding fair trials for the accused. Waving Albanian flags, they shouted "Albanians are not terrorists", "we are not terrorists, we are Albanians", "KLA (Kosovo Liberation Army)", "Greater Albania" "die, infidels", "murderers" "death to the Giaours" and "UÇK", and smashed windows in government offices and court buildings. Six policemen, one reporter and one cameraman were injured. The demonstrators also carried banners accusing Serbs and Macedonians of responsibility for the killings.

According to the Helsinki Committee for Human Rights, the Ministry of Internal Affairs "pressured the media and the courts of law" by prematurely judging the suspects "guilty for the crime, which is not in accordance with European standards". Concern was also expressed for Haki Aziri, who—under the witness protection program—was missing for six days before he appeared in court.

In February 2021, Agim and Afrim Ismailovic, Alil Demiri, and Fejzi and Haki Aziri were once again found guilty by the Skopje Criminal Court. Agim and Afrim Ismailovic and Alil Demiri were sentenced to life imprisonment. Fejzi and Haki Aziri were sentenced to 15 and 9 years of imprisonment, respectively.

Popular culture
The Macedonian film, When the Day Had No Name, is loosely based on the event.

See also

2012 Republic of Macedonia inter-ethnic violence

References

Modern history of North Macedonia
Albanian nationalism in North Macedonia
Mass murder in 2012
Terrorist incidents in Europe in 2012
April 2012 crimes
2012 crimes in the Republic of Macedonia
Islamic terrorism in North Macedonia
Terrorist incidents in North Macedonia
Albanian separatism
Nationalist terrorism in Europe
Murder in North Macedonia
2012 murders in Europe
2010s in Skopje